Reprise Musical Repertory Theatre is a series of four 12" long playing vinyl albums recorded in Los Angeles in 1963. The four albums were sold through mail order as a box set in 1963, then released separately to retail in 1964. They were conceived and produced by Frank Sinatra. Morris Stoloff was the musical director and the A&R Director was Sonny Burke.

The four discs feature the scores of four popular Broadway musicals of the time – namely Finian's Rainbow (1947), Kiss Me, Kate (1948), South Pacific (1949), and Guys and Dolls (1950) – as performed by various Reprise artists.

The "Guys and Dolls" album was issued on CD in 1992 when the musical itself was enjoying a revival. All the albums were re-released in a box set on September 26, 2000.

Track listing
Disc One - Finian's Rainbow

Disc Two - Kiss Me, Kate

Disc three - South Pacific

Disc four - Guys and Dolls

Personnel
 Frank Sinatra - vocals
 Dean Martin - vocals
 Sammy Davis, Jr. - vocals
 Bing Crosby - vocals
 Debbie Reynolds - vocals
 Rosemary Clooney - vocals
 Jo Stafford - vocals
 Keely Smith - vocals
 Dinah Shore - vocals
 The McGuire Sisters - vocals
 The Hi-Lo's - vocals
 Allan Sherman - vocals
 Nelson Riddle - arranger
 Marty Paich - arranger
 Skip Martin - arranger
 Billy May - arranger
 Morris Stoloff - conductor

References

Bing Crosby albums
Dean Martin albums
Sammy Davis Jr. albums
Rosemary Clooney albums
Albums arranged by Nelson Riddle
1963 albums
Album series
Reprise Records compilation albums
Frank Sinatra albums
Albums conducted by Morris Stoloff
Albums arranged by Marty Paich
Albums arranged by Skip Martin
Albums arranged by Billy May
albums produced by Sonny Burke